The 2005 UIAA Climbing World Championships, the 8th edition, were held in Munich, Germany from 1 to 5 July 2005. It was organized by the Union Internationale des Associations d'Alpinisme (UIAA). The championships consisted of lead, speed, and bouldering events.

The lead chief route-setter was Donato Lella.

Medalists

Men 
In men's lead, three climbers topped the route, and so their final standings were decided by their semifinal results.

In men's bouldering, the 38-year-old veteran Salavat Rakhmetov sent all six problems in his first attempts in the final round, claiming the gold. Second place Kilian Fischhuber also sent all six problems, but needed two attempts more than Rakhmetov, while third place Gerome Pouvreau needed 13 attempts to top and 11 attempts to zone all six boulder problems.

In men's speed, Evgenii Vaitsekhovskii won the gold medal, while Maksym Styenkovyy and Sergei Sinitcyn took second and third respectively.

Women 
In women's lead, Angela Eiter dominated the competition by being the only climber topping the semifinal route and climbing six meters higher than the rest of the competition on the final route. Emily Harrington climbed to second place while 16-year-old Akiyo Noguchi claimed the bronze medal, her first medal in senior competition. The defending champion Muriel Sarkany placed 10th.

In women's bouldering, Olga Shalagina had a clean run by topping all six boulder problems in her first attempts in the final round. Yulia Abramchuk and Vera Kotasova-Kostruhova sent five problems, separated by attempts. The 35-year-old Renata Piszczek from Poland finished 4th, ahead of Anna Stöhr.

In women's speed, Olena Ryepko took the win, and Valentina Yurina and Edyta Ropek claimed second and third place respectively.

References 

World Climbing Championships
IFSC Climbing World Championships
International sports competitions hosted by Germany